Adane is a given name or surname. 

Notable people with the given name include:
Adane Girma (born 1985), Ethiopian footballer

Notable people with the surname include:
Mentsenot Adane (born 1993), Ethiopian footballer

See also
Adané

Masculine given names